Cactus Park (8 hectares) is a commercial park with a botanical garden containing thousands of cactus and succulents, as well as a modest animal collection including yaks, goats, sheep, ducks, etc. It is located in Bessan, Hérault, Languedoc-Roussillon, France, and open daily in the warmer months; an admission fee is charged.

See also 
 List of botanical gardens in France

References 
 Cactus Park
 Au Cactus Francophone entry (French)
 Futura-Sciences entry (French)
 Gardenbreizh entry with photographs

Gardens in Hérault
Botanical gardens in France